Aradus robustus is a species of flat bug in the family Aradidae. It is found in North America.

Subspecies
These two subspecies belong to the species Aradus robustus:
 Aradus robustus insignis Parshley, 1921
 Aradus robustus robustus Uhler, 1871

References

Aradidae
Articles created by Qbugbot
Insects described in 1871